Lac railway station serves the town of Laç in Lezhe County, Albania.

The station was opened in 1963 and remained the terminus of a line from Vore until a further extension to Lezhë was completed in 1981.

The station was once (along with Fier) a vital hub for transporting goods like ores and ammonium nitrate as well as passengers. In 1991, the International Fertilizer Development Center reported that 80-90% of fertiliser produced in Laç was transported by rail from the station, but that whilst there were sufficient wagons and optimistic journey times, the storage facilities at the station were inadequate.

References

Railway stations in Albania
Railway stations opened in 1963